The Étoiles de Pau or Stars of Pau is an annual three-day event held in Pau, in the South of France, near the Pyrénées mountains. It is one of only seven annual Concours Complet International (CCI) five-star events in the world (the highest level of competition) as classified by the Fédération Équestre Internationale (FEI) and the only one held in France. It takes place every year in October in the Domaine de Sers in Pau.

The six others CCI Five Stars are the Burghley Horse Trials and Badminton Horse Trials, held in Great Britain, the Kentucky Three-Day Event and the Maryland 5 Star held in the United States, the Australian International Three Day Event, held in Australia, and the Luhmühlen Horse Trials, held in Germany.

Winners

External links 
Les étoiles de Pau website

Eventing
Equestrian sports competitions in France